A Lump of Coal is an Australian compilation album of Christmas music produced in 1991 by Dead Line Records (Australia) and First Warning Records (U.S.) for RCA Records.

Track listing
"Little Drummer Boy" – Hoodoo Gurus — 2:24
"The First Noel" – Crash Test Dummies — 3:42
"Step Into Christmas" – The Wedding Present (originally recorded by Elton John) — 4:48
"Blue X-mas (To Whom It May Concern)" – Drunken Boat (originally recorded by Miles Davis) — 4:19
"O Holy Night" – Divine Weeks — 4:52
"Bring a Torch, Jeanette, Isabella" – Carnival Art — 4:00
"Silent Night" – The Primitives — 2:12
"O Little Town of Bethlehem" – Young Fresh Fellows — 2:55
"Kings of Orient" – The Odds — 4:29
"Here Comes Santa Claus" – Clockhammer — 2:34
"'Twas the Night Before Christmas" – Henry Rollins — 4:08

References

Christmas compilation albums
1991 Christmas albums
1991 compilation albums
RCA Records compilation albums
RCA Records Christmas albums
Rock Christmas albums